New Alma Coal Camp was an unincorporated community and coal town located in Pike County, Kentucky, United States.

References

Unincorporated communities in Pike County, Kentucky
Unincorporated communities in Kentucky
Coal towns in Kentucky